Zheng Kaiping (born 7 November 1961) is a Chinese sailor. He competed in the 470 event at the 1984 Summer Olympics.

References

External links
 

1961 births
Living people
Chinese male sailors (sport)
Olympic sailors of China
Sailors at the 1984 Summer Olympics – 470
Place of birth missing (living people)